Lorentz is a huge lunar impact crater that lies just beyond the northwest limb of the Moon, in a region that is brought into sight of the Earth during favorable librations. This formation is nearly as large as the Mare Nectaris on the near side of the Moon, although it has not been submerged by lava as have the lunar mare. Sections of the crater floor are, however, relatively level, particularly an arc along the western rim. But this last region is still marked by a number of tiny craterlets. The remainder of the interior is rough and irregular, and marked with a multitude of impacts.

Lorentz contains a prominent crater pairing, with Nernst located just to the north of Lorentz's midpoint, and Röntgen attached to the southeastern rim of Nernst. Lying across the southern rim of Lorentz is Laue, and Avicenna lies across the northwestern rim. Near the more indeterminate eastern rim of Lorentz is Aston.

Satellite craters
By convention these features are identified on lunar maps by placing the letter on the side of the crater midpoint that is closest to Lorentz.

References

 
 
 
 
 
 
 
 
 
 
 
 

Impact craters on the Moon
Hendrik Lorentz